Ban Pru Krachaeng station is a railway station located in Ban Song Subdistrict, Wiang Sa District, Surat Thani.

Train services 
 Local No. 445/446 Chumphon-Hat Yai Junction-Chumphon
 Local No. 447/448 Surat Thani-Sungai Kolok-Surat Thani

References 
 
 

Railway stations in Thailand